National Home (HaBayit HaLeumi) was a short-lived political faction in Israel during 2006.

Background
National Home was formed on 5 February 2006 when two MKs, Hemi Doron and Eliezer Sandberg broke away from the Secular Faction (itself a recent breakaway from Shinui). The faction received 600,000 shekels in party funding (transferred from Hetz, the Secular Faction's new guise).

The faction was dissolved shortly before the March 2006 elections when both Doron and Sandberg joined Likud. They were included on Likud's Knesset list, placed in the symbolic 117th and 118th places in the party list, and both lost their seats.

References

External links
National Home Knesset website

Defunct political parties in Israel
Political parties established in 2006
Political parties disestablished in 2006
2006 establishments in Israel
2006 disestablishments in Israel